The coin rotation paradox is the counter-intuitive observation that, when one coin is rolled around the rim of another coin of equal size, the moving coin completes two full rotations after going all the way around the stationary coin.

Description
Start with two identical coins touching each other on a table, with their "head" sides displayed and parallel. Keeping coin A stationary, rotate coin B around A, keeping a point of contact with no slippage. As coin B reaches the opposite side, the two heads will again be parallel; B has made one revolution. Continuing to move B brings it back to the starting position and completes a second revolution. Paradoxically, coin B appears to have rolled a distance equal to twice its circumference. In reality, as the circumferences of both coins are equal, by definition coin B has only rolled a distance equal to its own circumference. The second rotation arises from the fact that the path along which it has rolled is a circle. This is analogous to simply rotating coin B "in situ". 

The best way to visualise the effect is to imagine the circumference of coin A "flattened out" into a straight line, by which means it will be readily observed, and indeed self-evident, that coin B has rotated only once as it travels along its, now flat, path. This is the "first rotation". Equally, sliding coin B around the circumference of coin A, instead of rolling it, whilst maintaining its current specific point of contact, will impart a rotation representative of the "second rotation" in the original scenario. 

As coin B rotates, each point on its perimeter describes (moves through) a cardioid curve.

Analysis and solution
From start to end, the center of the moving coin travels a circular path. The edge of the stationary coin and said path form two concentric circles. The radius of the path is the sum of the coins' radii; hence, the circumference of the path is twice either coin's circumference. The center of the moving coin travels twice the coin's circumference without slipping; therefore, the moving coin makes two complete revolutions.

How much the moving coin rotates around its own center en route, if any, or in what direction – clockwise, counterclockwise, or some of both – has no effect on the length of the path. That the coin rotates twice as described above and focusing on the edge of the moving coin as it touches the stationary coin are distractions.

Unequal radii and other shapes

A coin of radius r rolling around one of radius R makes R/r + 1 rotations.
That is because the center of the rolling coin travels a circular path with a radius (or circumference) of (R + r)/r = R/r + 1 times its own radius (or circumference). In the limiting case when R = 0, the coin with radius r makes 0/r + 1 = 1 simple rotation around its bottom point.

The May 1, 1982 SAT had a question concerning this problem, and, due to human error, had to be regraded after three students proved there was no correct answer among the choices.

The shape around which the coin is rolled need not be a circle: one extra rotation is added to the ratio of their perimeters when it is any simple polygon or closed curve which does not intersect itself. If the shape is complex, the number of rotations added (or subtracted, if the coin rolls inside the curve) is the absolute value of its turning number.

Application

The paradox is related to sidereal time: a sidereal day is the time Earth takes to rotate for a distant star to return to the same position in the sky, whereas a solar day is the time for the sun to return to the same position. A year has around 365.25 solar days, but 366.25 sidereal days to account for one revolution around the sun. A solar day is 24h so a sidereal day is around  = 23h 56min 4.1s.

See also 
 Cardioid
 Aristotle's wheel paradox

References

External links 
 
This upvoted answer includes animations and intuitive explanations about the original question where r of the "outer coin" was 1/3 of the inner coin's radius. 

Paradoxes
Geometry